The Gull River is a  tributary of the Crow Wing River in the U.S. state of Minnesota. It is part of the Mississippi River drainage basin.

See also
List of rivers of Minnesota

References

Minnesota Watersheds
USGS Hydrologic Unit Map - State of Minnesota (1974)

Rivers of Minnesota
Rivers of Cass County, Minnesota
Rivers of Crow Wing County, Minnesota
Tributaries of the Mississippi River